"America" is a song by English indie rock band Razorlight, included as the fourth track on their self-titled second studio album (2006).  It was written by Johnny Borrell and Andy Burrows (credited to Borrell, Burrows, and Razorlight) and was also released as the second single from that album on 2 October 2006.

The song garnered a negative reception from critics for its attempt at both political commentary and transatlantic crossover appeal. Nevertheless, "America" became the band's first and only number-one single in the United Kingdom and was the country's 17th best selling single of that year. The song also peaked within the top 10 in Ireland, the Netherlands and New Zealand, and within the top 40 in Austria, Belgium, France, Switzerland and Germany.

Critical reception
"America" received generally negative reviews from music critics, who found its attempt at serious commentary laughable and pretentious. Adam Zacharias of Drowned in Sound panned the song for cribbing the same lyrics from the previous single "In the Morning" and for coming off as trite commentary for the mass public, calling it "a terrible piece of faux-sentiment". Liz Colville of Stylus Magazine criticised the song's attempt at being a blue-collar anthem in the vein of Bruce Springsteen but without his particular musicianship. Michael Lomas of PopMatters called the song "soft rock hell".

John Murphy of MusicOMH was mixed towards the song, saying that it has the right amount of intimacy but found the lyrics "facile at best". Doug Kamin of ARTISTdirect praised Borrell's delivery of the song's overall message, saying that, "It's sung without judgment or criticism and could grab the ears of rock and pop lovers on both sides of the pond."

Track listings

UK 7-inch single 
A. "America"
B. "Down to the Coast" (demo)

UK limited-edition 7-inch single 
A. "America"
B. "Wilfred Owen" (demo)

UK maxi-CD single 
 "America"
 "Teenage Logic"
 "Fine"

European CD single 
 "America"
 "Teenage Logic"

Charts and certifications

Weekly charts

Year-end charts

Certifications

See also
 List of UK Singles Chart number ones of the 2000s

References

2006 singles
2006 songs
British soft rock songs
Mercury Records singles
Razorlight songs
Song recordings produced by Chris Thomas (record producer)
Songs about the United States
Songs written by Andy Burrows
Songs written by Johnny Borrell
UK Singles Chart number-one singles
Vertigo Records singles